The oil & gas basins of Kazakhstan can be grouped into four revealed or prospective oil & gas provinces in the Republic of Kazakhstan. Exploration in those provinces in which oil and gas has already been extracted had, by 2010, led to the discovery of more than 200 oil, gas, oil-and-gas and condensate hydrocarbon accumulations. Of these, the Kashagan, the Tengiz and the Karachaganak fields can be considered giants.

Oil & gas basins of Kazakhstan
Kazakhstan has a share in four oil & gas provinces:

1. The Pre-Caspian Basin lies in the western part of the country, behind the Mugodzhary mountains. The geology of this province is made up of Paleozoic sediments covering a Proterozoic basement.
 Southern Emba
 Northern Emba
 Eastern Emba
 Primorsk-Emba
 Northern Pre-Caspian
 Western Pre-Caspian
 Northern Caspian
 Central Pre-Caspian

2. The Mangistau-Usturt Basin lies in the Mangistau and Aktyubinsk areas of Kazakhstan.
 Southern Mangishlak
 Northern Buzashi
 Northern Usturt

3. The Central Kazakhstan Basin lies in the eastern and southern areas of Kazakhstan.
 Southern Torgay
 Eastern Aral
 Syr-Darya
 Chu-Sarysu
 Teniz
 Alakol
 Balkash
 Zaysan
 Ily

4. The Western Siberian Basin is in the northern and northeastern region of Kazakhstan, north of the Kokshetauskikh mountains. The geology is of a platform type, with a Mesozoic cover overlying a Paleozoic basement.
 Northern Kazakhstan
 Irtish

The basins are located in six provinces of Kazakhstan: Aktobe, Atyrau, West Kazakhstan, Karaganda, Kyzylorda and Mangystau provinces.

See also

Karachaganak Field - a natural gas condensate field in Kazakhstan     
Kashagan Field - an oil field located in Kazakhstan, situated in the northern part of the Caspian Sea
Khvalynskoye gas field - a conventional gas condensate field located in the Kazakhstan's sector in the northern part of the Caspian Sea
Kurmangazy oil field - an offshore oil field in the Kazakh section of Caspian Sea.
Tengiz Field - an oil and gas field located in northwestern Kazakhstan's low-lying wetlands along the northeast shores of the Caspian Sea

References

External links
Kazakhstan's Gas: Export Markets and Export Routes, by Shamil Yenikeyeff, Oxford Institute for Energy Studies, November 2008

Oil fields of Kazakhstan
Natural gas fields in Kazakhstan
Geology of Kazakhstan
Geography of Kazakhstan
Petroleum in Kazakhstan